Lewes is a local government district in East Sussex in southern England covering an area of , with  of coastline. It is named after its administrative centre, Lewes. Other towns in the district include Newhaven, Peacehaven, Seaford and Telscombe. Plumpton racecourse is within the district. There are 28 parishes in the district.

The district was formed on 1 April 1974 by the Local Government Act 1972, and was a merger of the former borough of Lewes along with Newhaven and Seaford urban districts and Chailey Rural District.

Politics

Elections to the council are held every four years, with all of the 41 seats, representing 21 wards, on the council being filled.

Since July 2019, following the May election, an alliance of councillors from the Green, Liberal Democrat, and Labour parties, plus two Independents, has controlled the council, with Green Councillor Zoe Nicholson and Liberal Democrat Councillor James MacCleary holding the leader and deputy leader roles alternating each year.

After being controlled by the Liberal Democrats since 1991, the Conservative party regained a majority at the 2011 election. However, subsequent defections of Conservative councillors to UKIP and the Liberal Democrats left the council in no overall control. In the subsequent council election on 7 May 2015, the Conservatives regained control with an increased majority and heavy losses for the Liberal Democrats.  In March 2020, Cllr Sean Macleod resigned from the Green Party, joining the Liberal Democrats in June 2020.

The current composition is as follows:

Geography

The district wards are:

The civil parishes within the district are:

‡ St John Without, St Ann Without, Tarring Neville and Southease are separate Parish Meetings but have been merged with their neighbouring parishes for the population statistics.

The Sussex Police has its head office in Lewes, Lewes District.

The Prime Meridian passes through the district.

References

 
Non-metropolitan districts of East Sussex
Coast to Capital Local Enterprise Partnership
1974 establishments in England